2012 in Korea may refer to:
2012 in North Korea
2012 in South Korea